The Fujifilm XF 35mm F1.4 R is an interchangeable camera lens announced by Fujifilm on January 9, 2012. As of 2015, it remains one of the widest-aperture 35mm lenses available, giving a normal field of view on Fujifilm's APS-C format digital cameras.

References

35
Camera lenses introduced in 2012